Filmworks X: In the Mirror of Maya Deren features a score for film by John Zorn. The album was released on Zorn's own label, Tzadik Records, in 2001 and contains music that Zorn wrote and recorded for the documentary film In the Mirror of Maya Deren on the life and work of Maya Deren directed by Martina Kudlácek.

Reception

The Allmusic review by Thom Jurek awarded the album 4½ stars noting that "In the Mirror of Maya Deren is Zorn's most compelling work for film yet. As a conceptualist, Zorn is not to be outdone -- he sees things in total, and this score is one piece, full of segue, room, drift, and dream. Deren would have been at the very least pleased, and that is as high a compliment as can be paid to this wonderful work by one of the most prolific, poetic, and profound composers".

Track listing
All compositions by John Zorn
 "Drifting 1" - 2:13 				
 "Dancing" - 5:12					
 "Kiev 1" - 3:57 					
 "Teiji's Time" - 2:16			
 "Nostalgia 1" - 3:41				
 "Filming" - 5:51 					
 "Mirror Worlds" - 1:50 				
 "Nightscape" - 2:27 				
 "Nostalgia 2" - 4:21 				
 "Haiti" - 2:34 					
 "Kiev 2" - 4:42 					
 "Voudoun" - 3:27 				
 "Drifting 2" - 2:12 				
 "Kiev 3" - 4:41 					
 "Drifting 3" - 2:17

Personnel
Erik Friedlander - cello
Jamie Saft - piano, organ, Wurlitzer
Cyro Baptista - percussion
John Zorn - piano, percussion (tracks 1, 4, 7, 13 & 15)

References

Tzadik Records soundtracks
Albums produced by John Zorn
John Zorn soundtracks
2001 soundtrack albums
Film scores